Chu Jung-Hyun (born January 28, 1988) is a South Korean football player who currently plays for Korea National League side Mokpo City FC. His previous clubs are K-League side Gangwon FC, National League side Yongin City FC and Daejeon KHNP.

On November 20, 2008, Gangwon was called Chu as extra order at 2009 K-League Draft. He made his debut for Gangwon against Daegu FC by substitute on April 8, 2009 in league cup match. From 2010 season, he joined Korea National League side Yongin City FC.

Club career statistics

References

External links
 K-League Player Record 

1988 births
Living people
South Korean footballers
Gangwon FC players
K League 1 players
Korea National League players
Myongji University alumni
Association football midfielders